Rosamond Jane Kember (born 28 January 1985) is a New Zealand former cricketer who played as a right-handed batter. She appeared in 10 One Day Internationals and 3 Twenty20 Internationals for New Zealand between 2006 and 2008.  She played domestic cricket for Northern Districts and Auckland.

References

External links

1985 births
Living people
Cricketers from Auckland
New Zealand women cricketers
New Zealand women One Day International cricketers
New Zealand women Twenty20 International cricketers
Northern Districts women cricketers
Auckland Hearts cricketers